Phillip Richard Lawrence (24 August 1915 – 25 January 1960) was an Australian politician. He was a Labor member of the Western Australian Legislative Assembly from 1951 to 1960, representing the district of South Fremantle.

He served with the 2nd AIF in North Africa during the Second World War.

Dick Lawrence Oval located in Beaconsfield is named in his honour.

1915 births
1960 deaths
Members of the Western Australian Legislative Assembly
Australian Labor Party members of the Parliament of Western Australia
20th-century Australian politicians
Australian Army personnel of World War II